The 1998 California Courts of Appeal election was held November 3, 1998.
The judges of the California Courts of Appeal are either approved to remain in their seat or rejected by the voters. All of the judges kept their seats.

Results
Final results from the California Secretary of State:

District 1

Division 1

Division 2

Division 3

Division 4

Division 5

District 2

Division 1

Division 2

Division 3

Division 4

Division 5

Division 6

Division 7

District 3

District 4

Division 1

Division 2

Division 3

District 5

District 6

References

See also

Courts of Appeal elections, 1998
1998 Courts of Appeal